Brydan Klein (born 31 December 1989) is an Australian-born British professional tennis player. As a junior, Klein won the 2007 Australian Open and reached a career-high top five in the ITF junior rankings. However, Klein has struggled to make the transition onto the men's professional circuit, failing to enter the top 150 or gain entry into any Grand Slam event without being given a Wild card.

Klein competes mainly on the ATP Challenger Tour.

Junior career
Klein began his professional tennis career playing on the ITF Men's Circuit in various events across Australia aged just 15. He featured sporadically on the ITF Circuit throughout 2005 and 2006, winning his first title alongside Matthew Ebden in a doubles event in Traralgon in October 2006. During that year, he also competed at Challenger level for the first time in his career. At the start of 2007, Klein competed in the Australian Open Junior Championships, and won the event after beating Jonathan Eysseric in three sets in the final. This resulted in Klein reaching a career high juniors ranking of no. 4.

Senior career

2007–2008
Throughout 2007, Klein began playing Futures tournaments on a much more regular basis, and secured his first singles title in Sawtell, Australia in October that year, beating Miles Armstrong 6–1, 6–3 in the final. At the start of the following year, he received a wildcard into the main draw of the 2008 Australian Open, although lost 4–6, 5–7, 4–6 to Paul Capdeville in the opening round. Shortly after, he returned to Futures action and earned his second singles title win in Mildura, defeating number one seed Nathan Healey in the final. He went on to win a further two singles titles during the year, both of which coming away from Australia, in New Zealand and Belarus respectively. Klein ended 2008 ranked no. 256, a ranking that was 350 places higher than his year-end 2007 ranking.

2009–2012
Klein received wildcard entries into both the Brisbane International and the 2009 Australian Open. A first round loser in Brisbane, Klein acquired his first Grand Slam victory at the Australian Open against Björn Phau 6–4, 6–3, 4–6, 6–3, before falling to Stanislas Wawrinka in straight sets in the Second Round. Following his Australian Open efforts, Klein won the 2009 McDonald's Burnie International, the first challenger title win of his career. He did not lose a set during the tournament, securing the title courtesy of 6–3, 6–3 victory over Grega Žemlja in the final. Klein followed the win up by securing both singles and doubles Futures victories in Mildura the following week, having also won the singles event in 2008. He beat Matthew Ebden in the final of that tournament, before teaming up with him to win the doubles title. Following his impressive start to 2009, Klein was called up to represent Australia at Davis Cup level, and played in Australia's 3–2 win over Thailand in a Second Round match, although lost his match to Danai Udomchoke. He also entered the 2009 French Open, but lost in the opening qualifying round to Kevin Anderson. Klein began to play at Challenger level and on the ATP World Tour throughout 2009 to little success, although did reach a career singles high of no. 174 when he reached the last 16 during his controversial participation at the 2009 Aegon International. He ended 2009 by returning to playing at Futures level in Australia, with a year-end ranking of no. 200.

His 2010 campaign started slowly, with First Round qualifying defeats in Brisbane, Sydney and the 2010 Australian Open, before suffering a First Round loss in the Burnie Challenger, the tournament he had won a year earlier. By February 2010, his ranking had dropped 200 places to outside the top 400 after failing to defend his ranking points. Klein subsequently returned to the Futures Circuit in an attempt regain form, and was able to secure his first singles title in over a year when he defeated compatriot John Millman in three sets in Little Rock, Arkansas in April 2010. Klein returned to Australia, and proceeded to win two further Futures titles, both of which on clay, within the space of a week in early May that year. In the summer of 2010, he headed to North America to prepare for the 2010 US Open, and played in various Challenger tournaments as part of his preparation programme ahead of the tournament – reaching the quarter-final stage of both the Comerica Bank Challenger in Aptos, California, as well as the Challenger Banque Nationale de Granby in Granby, Quebec, Canada. Despite his extensive stay in the continent, Klein suffered a convincing 3–6, 1–6 loss to Kevin Kim in the opening qualifying round of the US Open. During the latter stages of 2010, Klein reached four straight finals in Futures tournaments in Australia and New Zealand, but lost all four. He ended 2010 ranked at no. 214.

Similarly to 2010, Klein's start to 2011 witnessed a number of First Round losses, including another opening round qualification defeat at the Australian Open, this time at the hands of Konstantin Kravchuk. Klein had been banned from competing for a main draw wildcard for the event following "a string of on-court misdemeanours". Todd Woodbridge, Tennis Australia's director of men's tennis, stated the ban was for "numerous accounts of unacceptable behaviour at tournaments both locally and internationally". During the first three months of the year, Klein won just one main draw match from nine tournaments. He struggled for form throughout the year, and competed at Futures level for the remainder of his 2011 campaign, yielding just one singles title in Kalgoorlie, Australia, in October. Klein remained in Europe for most of the year, and won five doubles titles during his time there – and a further three towards the latter stages of the year in Australia, all of which at Futures level. Klein ended the year ranked no. 451 in singles, a drop of over 200 places from his 2010 ranking.

Klein took a three-month break from the Circuit from October 2011 to late January 2012, returning to action in the qualifying draw at the 2012 McDonald's Burnie International, although was beaten by Dane Propoggia in straight sets in the Second Round of qualifying. The following week, he improved to reach the quarter-finals of the 2012 Caloundra International. Klein then reached the final of the Futures event in Mildura in February 2012, an event that he had previously won twice, but lost to Hiroki Moriya in three sets. He spent the summer months of the year playing in Turkey and Spain Futures events; beating Frenchman Jules Marie to win in Bakio, Spain, as well as securing two titles in Turkey by beating the young Italian Lorenzo Giustino in the final in Tekirdağ and then Mohamed Safwat in Antalya. He also won consecutive Challenger doubles titles alongside compatriot Dane Propoggia; firstly in San Benedetto del Tronto and then in Recanati. Klein's fine form during the summer continued when he reached the semi-finals of the 2012 President's Cup in Astana, Kazakhstan, before losing to the eventual champion, Evgeny Donskoy. His performances throughout the year enabled him to earn a place in qualifying at the 2012 US Open, where he was defeated by Karol Beck in the second round of qualification. During the year, he won three singles titles, as well as twelve doubles titles, ending 2012 ranked at no. 241 in singles and no. 134 in doubles.

2013–
Klein began the year by competing at the 2013 Australian Open, but lost in straight sets in the First Round of qualifying to Riccardo Ghedin. Klein and doubles partner Propoggia reached another Challenger doubles final, but lost to the pairing of John-Patrick Smith and Ruan Roelofse at the 2013 McDonald's Burnie International. The pair would go one better in early March 2013, securing their third Challenger title by beating Alex Bolt and Nick Kyrgios in the final of the 2013 Nature's Way Sydney Tennis International. The result gave Klein a career high doubles ranking of no. 118.

Switch to Great Britain
In April 2013, the LTA, the national governing body of tennis in Great Britain, were informed of Klein's desire to switch his nationality from Australian to British through the International Tennis Federation. A month later, it was announced that Klein had completed his switch to playing under a British licence. Despite being born in Rockingham, Australia, his mother was from Manchester, England, and therefore Klein was able to switch allegiance. The move followed Tennis Australia's decision to withdraw their support for Klein following a "fractured relationship" with Klein having "a very chequered history of on-court behaviours". Klein stated it was a move he had been thinking about for four years — "It was a very difficult decision and I've had it in the back of my mind for four years, but haven't wanted to go forward with it. Finally, I thought, 'Look, I'm 23, I need a new environment, I need to do something to give myself a chance to improve my game'." The move also allowed Klein to "ease the financial burden" that has meant he had to fund the previous three years of touring himself, only gaining access to a coach when he was competing in Turkey. He hoped the move would help realise his dream of making a "living out of the sport I love, which would be making top 100 singles and top 50 doubles". Klein also spoke of further aspirations of competing for the Great Britain Davis Cup team — "In the years to come, there's Davis Cup if they want me and my ranking is high enough and, of course, they have a grand slam the same as us, so there's opportunities there. No.3 is within shooting range of playing Davis Cup, but obviously I'm not going to go in expecting to play Davis Cup for a few years."

Shortly after the switch, Klein entered the qualifying for the 2013 French Open, but lost in straight sets in the First Round of qualification to French wildcard, Mathias Bourgue.

Six-month ban

In July 2009, Klein accepted a six-month ban from the ATP after racially abusing an opponent at a tournament in England. He used the racist term "kaffir" to describe South African player Raven Klaasen at the grasscourt event in Eastbourne. He was suspended by the Australian Institute of Sport, meaning he received no funding, coaching or fitness support during the length of his ban. He agreed to complete a racial sensitivity course, and issued a public apology for his actions, stating — ""During the second set, after losing a point, I audibly used a racial slur. It was not my intention to racially vilify my opponent or cause offence to anybody else and I am deeply embarrassed that I behaved in this manner. I deeply regret my serious error in judgment in using this word and I am very sorry for the offence this has caused. After the match I called my opponent Raven and apologised for what had happened and also apologised for any offence caused to his support team". He was fined $14,000 by the ATP, the maximum possible amount by the organisation, and later fined a further $10,000 following a full investigation into the incident.

Talking about the incident in December 2010, Klein's father said — "It is sad to see him continually punished for what was, in truth, one single word muttered inaudibly over 18 months ago. It was reported inaccurately then and continues to be. The way he was disciplined, you would think it was a constant, repeated offence. What pains me most is the way that, more than a year later, Brydan's indiscretion is still being dragged up again and again. He didn't actually know what the meaning of the word 'kaffir' was. He actually heard the South African players say it. He thought it was a swear word, so when he said it, he obviously had no idea what he was saying. He was only 18 years old and the other person didn't even hear it and it didn't really affect the match. I was there, sitting close to where Brydan was as humanly as possible apart from being on the court, and you couldn't hear anything. If you had been there you wouldn't have heard anything either so it's not like he was ranting or raving at his opponent, calling him names and being racist, because he's anything but. One day he will be able to tell the truth but right now he is stuck from telling the truth."

Challengers and Futures finals

Singles: 33 (20–13)

Doubles: 81 (48–33)

References

External links
 
 
 
 Klein Recent Match Results
 Klein World Ranking History

Australian male tennis players
British male tennis players
Australian Open (tennis) junior champions
Tennis players from Perth, Western Australia
1989 births
Living people
Grand Slam (tennis) champions in boys' singles